"Tears Dry on Their Own" is a song by English singer and songwriter Amy Winehouse from her second and final studio album, Back to Black (2006). It was released on 13 August 2007 as the album's fourth single. While the melody and lyrics are composed by Winehouse, the music behind her voice is an interpolation of Marvin Gaye and Tammi Terrell's 1967 song "Ain't No Mountain High Enough", penned by Ashford & Simpson. The original ballad version of the track is featured on the posthumous album Lioness: Hidden Treasures (2011). The song was featured in the documentary film based on the life and death of Winehouse, Amy (2015) and was also included on the film's soundtrack.

Composition 
"Tears Dry on Their Own" has been described by NME as a "Motown-influenced pop song", while Billy Hamilton of Drowned in Sound believed the song to be a soul song.

Music video
Tears Dry on Their Own's music video was shot in Los Angeles, and directed by David LaChapelle on 22 May 2007. Featuring Winehouse making her way down Hollywood Blvd and in a dim motel room, the video features the Grand Motel at 1479 S La Cienega Blvd, in Los Angeles. The hotel room is a nod to the ones she would stay in while waiting for her to-be-husband, Blake Fielder-Civil to arrive. The music video for this song was the second to last filmed before Winehouse's death on 23 July 2011.

Chart performance
"Tears Dry on Their Own" became Winehouse's fourth consecutive single to chart inside the top 40 of the UK Singles Chart, when it entered at number 37 on 5 August 2007. It also became her eighth UK R&B top 40 hit. The single spent four weeks at number one on the UK Airplay Chart during August. After the song's physical release, the single climbed into the top 20, peaking at number 16. Therefore, "Tears Dry on Their Own" is Winehouse's second highest-charting single behind "Rehab" and the fourth consecutive top 30 hit from her second album. To date, it has spent 19 non-consecutive weeks on the UK Singles Chart, making it her fourth longest-running hit behind "Rehab" (57 weeks), "Valerie" (39 weeks), and "Back to Black" (34 weeks).

With sales of 84,750, "Tears Dry on Their Own" went on to become the UK's 93rd best-selling single of 2007.

On 31 July 2011, the song re-entered the UK Singles Chart at 27 after Winehouse's death.

Track listings and formats

UK CD single
"Tears Dry on Their Own" – 3:09
"You're Wondering Now" – 2:31
"Tears Dry on Their Own" (Alix Alvarez Sole Channel Mix) – 6:42
"Tears Dry on Their Own" (Al Usher Remix) – 7:00
"Tears Dry on Their Own" (Video)

UK limited edition clear 7" single
Side A:
"Tears Dry on Their Own" – 3:05
Side B:
"Tears Dry on Their Own" (NYPC's Fucked Mix) – 4:39

UK 12" single
Side A:
"Tears Dry on Their Own" (Alix Alvarez Sole Channel Mix) – 6:42
Side B:
"Tears Dry on Their Own" (Al Usher Remix) – 7:00
"Tears Dry on Their Own" – 3:05

Digital download – Remixes & B-Sides EP 
"Tears Dry on Their Own" (Vodafone Live at TBA) – 3:23
"Tears Dry on Their Own" (Alix Alvarez Sole Channel Mix) – 5:35
"Tears Dry on Their Own" (NYPC's Fucked Mix) – 4:39
"Tears Dry on Their Own" (Al Usher Remix) – 6:59
"Tears Dry on Their Own" (Kardinal Beats Remix) – 3:21

Official versions and remixes
Album Version – 3:05
Al Usher Remix – 7:00
Alix Alvarez Sole Channel Mix – 6:42
Kardinal Beats Remix – 3:20
NYPC's Fucked Mix – 4:39
Original Version — 4:09

Personnel
"Tears Dry on Their Own"
 Recorded by Franklin Socorro
 Mixed by Tom Elmhirst
 Producer – Salaam Remi
 Recorded by Gleyder "Gee" Disla, Shomari "Sho" Dillon
 Bass, piano, guitar – Salaam Remi
 Written by Amy Winehouse
 Drums, tambourine – Troy Auxilly-Wilson
 Mixed by Matt Paul
 Trumpet (bass), trumpet, flugelhorn – Bruce Purse
 Saxophone (baritone, tenor and alto), flute, clarinet, piano, celesta (celeste), guitar – Vincent Henry
 Backing vocals – Amy Winehouse
"You're Wondering Now"
 Recorded by Jon Moon
 Featuring – Ade*, Zalon*
 Written by Nickolas Ashford and Valerie Simpson*, Clement Dodd

Charts

Weekly charts

Year-end charts

Certifications

References

External links
Behind-the-scenes photos of the music video

2006 songs
2007 singles
Amy Winehouse songs
Music videos directed by David LaChapelle
Songs written by Amy Winehouse
Songs written by Valerie Simpson
Songs written by Nickolas Ashford
Island Records singles
British pop songs